Cydalima diaphanalis is a moth in the family Crambidae. It was described by Francis Walker in 1866. It is found in Burma, Indonesia (Java, Sumatra, Kepulauan Aru, Papua New Guinea), on the Solomon Islands and in Thailand and Australia, where it has been recorded from Queensland and South Australia.

The wings are white with a small black dot near the middle. The forewings have a brown costa and there are black dots on the margin near the wingtip.

References

Moths described in 1866
Spilomelinae